Pseudocatharylla chalcipterus is a moth in the family Crambidae. It was described by George Hampson in 1896. It is found in Assam, India.

References

Crambinae
Moths described in 1896